The Skoda 150 mm Model 1918 was a heavy mountain howitzer, manufactured by Skoda Works. The design was begun during World War I, but the first prototype was completed as the war ended. After 1938, the Wehrmacht designated the few built as 15 cm GebH 18(t), although it's uncertain if they were actually used. The gun could be transported on six carts; each cart pulled by at least two horses or mules. The barrel assembly required three towing animals.

References
 Chamberlain, Peter and Gander, Terry. Infantry, Mountain and Airborne Guns
 Gander, Terry and Chamberlain, Peter. Weapons of the Third Reich: An Encyclopedic Survey of All Small Arms, Artillery and Special Weapons of the German Land Forces 1939-1945. New York: Doubleday, 1979 

World War II mountain artillery
Artillery of Czechoslovakia
150 mm artillery